Richard W. Miller the Wyn and William Y. Hutchinson Professor in Ethics and Public Life and Director of the Program on Ethics and Public Life in the Cornell University Department of Philosophy.  He specializes in moral philosophy, political philosophy, and philosophy of science.

Education and career
Miller received his Ph.D. from Harvard University in 1975. His dissertation, "Solipsism and Language in the Writings of Wittgenstein," was directed by Rogers Albritton and Hilary Putnam.  He has spent his entire academic career at Cornell.

Philosophical work
While he currently specializes in social and political philosophy, Miller has published books and articles on epistemology, philosophy of science, and ethics.  His most recent book is Globalizing Justice: The Ethics of Poverty and power.

He is the author of Marx and Aristotle, in Alex Callinicos's Marxist Theory series as well as of several books, including Moral Differences: Truth, Justice, and Conscience in a World of Conflict (Princeton, 1992), Fact and Method: Explanation, Confirmation, and Reality in the Natural and the Social Sciences (Princeton, 1987), and Analyzing Marx: Morality, Power, and History (Princeton, 1984).

See also
 American philosophy
 List of American philosophers

References

External links
 Sage School Faculty - Selected Publications

Harvard University alumni
Cornell University faculty
American philosophers
Living people
Place of birth missing (living people)
Year of birth missing (living people)
Political philosophers
Philosophers of science